Syringol is the organic compound with the formula HO(CH3O)2C6H3.  The molecule is a phenol, with methoxy groups in the flanking (2 and 6) positions.  It is the symmetrically dimethylated derivative of pyrogallol.  It is a colorless solid, although typical samples are brown owing to air-oxidized impurities. Together with guaiacol, syringol and its derivatives are produced by the pyrolysis of lignin. Specifically, syringol is derived from the thermal decomposition of the sinapyl alcohol component. As such, syringol is an important component of wood smoke.

Syringyl/guaiacyl ratio
Lignin, comprising a major fraction of biomass, is sometimes classified according to the syringyl component. Pyrolysis of lignin derived from sinapyl alcohol affords syringol.  The conversion involves replacement of the propenyl alcohol substituent of the sinapyl alcohol by hydrogen. A high syringyl (or S) content is indicative of lignin from angiosperms.  In contrast, pyrolysis of lignin from gymnosperms gives more guaiacol, resulting from conversion of coniferyl alcohol.  These lignins have a high guaiacyl (or G) content.

Food preparation
In preparation of food by smoking, syringol is the main chemical responsible for the smoky aroma, while guaiacol contributes mainly to taste. Artificial liquid or solid smoke flavorings also contain these chemicals, on average composing 13.73% and 13.42% of those products by mass respectively.

Chemical feedstock
Pyrolysis oil, a biofuel derived from woody biomass, can be optimized to yield syringol as a byproduct, potentially competing with petroleum-derived phenols. Some studies indicate that syringol can substitute for phenol formaldehyde resin, a commonly used, water resistant adhesive for plywood.

See also 

Phenolic content in wine
Syringaldehyde
Syringic acid
Acetosyringone
Sinapaldehyde
Sinapinic acid
Sinapine
Canolol

References 

O-methylated natural phenols